The Rivière Couchepaganiche is a tributary of Lac Saint-Jean, flowing in the municipality of Métabetchouan–Lac-à-la-Croix, in the Lac-Saint-Jean-Est Regional County Municipality, in the administrative region of Saguenay–Lac-Saint-Jean, in the province of Quebec, in Canada. The course of the Couchepaganiche river crosses the township of Caron.

The lower part of the Couchepaganiche river valley is served by the route 169 which runs along the southeast shore of lac Saint-Jean. This valley is also served by some secondary forest roads, especially for forestry and recreational tourism activities.

Forestry and agriculture are the main economic activities in this valley; recreational tourism, second.

The surface of the Couchepaganiche River is usually frozen from the beginning of December to the end of March, however the safe circulation on the ice is generally made from mid-December to mid-March.

Geography 
The main watersheds neighboring the Couchepaganiche River are:
 north side: lac Saint-Jean;
 east side: La Belle Rivière, Bédard River, Petite rivière Bédard, Saguenay River;
 south side: lac de la Belle Rivière, La Belle Rivière, rivière des Aulnaies, Métabetchouane River, Couchepaganiche East River;
 west side: Métabetchouane River, Lac Saint-Jean.

The Couchepaganiche river rises from the water body in the south of Les Trois Lacs in the forest zone, located south- is from the Three Round Peaks Mountain. This source is located at:
  south-east of route 169;
  west of lac de la Belle Rivière;
  south-east of the center of the village of Métabetchouan;
  south-east of the confluence of the Couchepaganiche river and Lac Saint-Jean;
  south-west of downtown Alma.

  north-west, up to a bend in the river near the crossing of chemin du Petit rang and route Saint-André;
  northerly, curving northwest at the end of the segment, up to the outlet (coming from the northwest) of Skein Lake;
  towards the north-east, winding its way into agricultural territory and passing north of a mountain, to the confluence of the Couchepaganiche East River (coming from the south);
  towards the northwest by winding through an agricultural plain, cutting the path of 2e rang Ouest, the route 169 and the Canadian National railway at the end of the segment, to its mouth.

The Couchepaganiche river flows on the southeast shore of Lac Saint-Jean in the village of Métabetchouan. This confluence is located at:
  north-east of the confluence of the Métabetchouane River and Lac Saint-Jean;
  west of the village center of Hébertville;
  south of the mouth of Lac Saint-Jean (via La Petite Décharge);
  south-west of Alma city center;
  south-west of downtown Chicoutimi (sector of Saguenay (city)).

f

Toponymy 
Joseph-Laurent Normandin notes in his "Travel Journal"... from 1732 the name "Guspajganichiche" to designate this river. In his deposition of 1823, the explorer François Verreault affirms that this small river is called "Koushpygish", Innu term meaning "where the water rises a little". However, the “Little Dictionary of Geographical Names of the Saguenay”, published in 1944, notes that “Koushpaiganish” is an Innu word meaning “small river of embarkation”, a meaning also attributed to him by the explorer Normandin.

The toponym “Rivière Couchepaganiche” was formalized on December 5, 1968, at the Place Names Bank of the Commission de toponymie du Québec.

Notes and references

Appendices

Related articles 
 Lac-Saint-Jean-Est Regional County Municipality
 Métabetchouan–Lac-à-la-Croix, a municipality
 Couchepaganiche East River
 Lac Saint-Jean, a body of water
 Saguenay River, a stream
 List of rivers of Quebec

Rivers of Saguenay–Lac-Saint-Jean
Regional county municipalities in Saguenay–Lac-Saint-Jean